Coverage may refer to:

Filmmaking
 Coverage (lens), the size of the image a lens can produce
 Camera coverage, the amount of footage shot and different camera setups used in filming a scene
 Script coverage, a short summary of a script, written by script readers to recommend whether a film should be made

Media and journalism
 Broadcasting, radio, television, etc.
 News ("press coverage", "media coverage"), the communication of selected information on current events

Music
 Coverage, a Descendents/ALL cover band from Calgary, Alberta, Canada
 Coverage (album), a 2003 album by Mandy Moore

Science and technology
 Code coverage measure used in software testing
 Coverage (telecommunication), a measure of cell phone or radio connectivity
 Coverage (information systems), a measure for the quality/completeness of an information service
 Coverage (shot peening), a criterium for quality of shot peening introduced by J.O. Almen in the 1940s
 Coverage data, the mapping of one aspect of data in space, in geographic information systems
 Coverage probability, in statistics

 Coverage (genetics) or sequence coverage, or depth, in genetic sequencing

Other uses
 Analyst coverage, securities assigned to a particular financial analyst for regular assessment
 Insurance coverage, the amount and extent of risk covered by an insurer

See also
 
 
 Cover (disambiguation)
 Covfefe, a typo of the word seen on Donald Trump's Twitter account